Kany Garcia is the third studio album of Latin Grammy winner, singer-songwriter Kany García. It was released on August 14, 2013 and produced by Kany García, Julio Reyes Copello and Paul Forat Sony BMG. The album's first single "Que Te Vaya Mal" was nominated for Record of the Year at the 2012 Latin Grammy Awards. The album was nominated for "Best Latin Pop Album" at the 2013 Grammy Awards.

Album information
The album was recorded in Bogotá, Colombia. The live version of the album, which was recorded for a mini-movie/live concert type available as part of the CD/DVD set or iTunes digital format was recorded in the Pontificia Javeriana University in Bogotá.

Promotion
As a part of promotion, Kany released a song from the album each week in July starting with the first single "Que Te Vaya Mal". The other songs released were "Alguien", "Demasiado Bueno" and "Me Quedo".

Singles
"Que Te Vaya Mal" was released as the album's lead single on April 24, 2012. 
"Alguien" is chosen as the album second single and will be released sometime in August. It peaked at #8 on Billboard Latin Pop chart.
"Cuando Se Va El Amor" was officially announced as the third single by Kany Garcia via her Facebook page. The song reached the Top 40 on Billboard's Latin Song Chart and Top 30 on Latin Pop Airplay.
"Adiós" was released as the album's fourth single on April 22, 2013. The song reached the Top 40 on Billboard's Latin Pop Chart.

Promotional singles
Prior to the release of the album, two promotional singles were released exclusively on iTunes Store as a "Countdown to KANY GARCIA".
"Demasiado Bueno" was the first promotional single, released on July 18, 2012.
"Me Quedo" was the second and last promotion single, released on July 24, 2012.

Track listing

Notes
 Track listing and credits from album booklet.

Personnel 
Confirmed by the album booklet.

Kany García - Composer, Primary Artist
Juan Sebastian Atehortua - Trumpet
Jairo Alfonso Barrera - Saxophone
Antonio Carmona - Cajon, Guitars
Andrés Castro - Guitars
Julio Reyes Copello - Composer
Santiago Prieto - Guitars
Libardo Rey - Guitars
Julio Reyes - Keyboards, Piano
Miguel Rico - Keyboards, Piano

Marcos Sanchez - Keyboards, Organo, Piano
Froilán Sinti - Kena
Aaron Sterling - Bateria
Samuel Torres - Percussion
Guillermo Vadala - Bass
Juan Pablo Vega - Guitars
Jimmy Zambrano - Accordion
Oscar Grajales - Main Personnel
Marcial Sinti - Main Personnel

Production
Miguel Roldan - Director
Julio Reyes Copello - Engineer, Producer
Edgar Barrera - Engineer
Natalia Ramírez - Assistant Engineer
Julián Pinzón - Assistant Engineer
Javier Garza - Engineer, Mixing
Sebastian de Peyrecave - Engineer
Ricardo Escallón - Coordination

Paul Forat - Executive Producer
Francesc Freixes - Graphic Design
Mike Fuller - Mastering
Andrea Bautista - Coordination
Táriq Zia Burney - Assistant Engineer
Lorenzo Caballero - Assistant Engineer
Isabel de Jesús - A&R
Rubén Martín - Photography
Julio Muniz - A&R

Tour

"Kany García: En Concierto" is the concert tour  by  Puerto Rican singer-songwriter Kany García in support of her third studio album of the same name. The tour started in Puerto Rico and continues in US and Latin American countries like Dominican Republic, Costa Rica and Mexico.

Setlist

Tour dates

Cancellations and rescheduled shows

Chart performance
On its first day of release, the album charted at #189 on iTunes top 200 albums chart, #2 on iTunes Latino album charts and #1 on Pop Latino album charts in United States and Puerto Rico. The album debuted at #1 on Billboard Latin Pop Album Chart and Puerto Rico Album Charts. It debuted at #5 on Billboard Latin Albums Chart and #89 on Mexico Top 100. It remain at #1 for 2 straight weeks on Puerto Rico Album Charts on its second week, and reached #72 on Mexico Top 100 on its third week.

Charts

Certifications

Awards/Nominations

Release history

References 

2012 albums
Kany García albums
Albums produced by Julio Reyes Copello